is a passenger railway station located in the city of  Kōka, Shiga, Japan operated by the third-sector Shigaraki Kohgen Railway.

Lines

Station layout
The station consists of one side platform serving single bi-directional track. There is no station building, and the station is unattended.

Adjacent stations

History
Chokushi Station opened on June 1, 1963.

Passenger statistics

Surrounding area
 Yawata Jinja
 Tenjin Jinja
 Japan National Route 307

See also
List of railway stations in Japan

References

External links

Shigaraki Railway home page

Railway stations in Japan opened in 1963
Railway stations in Shiga Prefecture
Kōka, Shiga